Steve Conley may refer to:

Steve Conley (running back), American football player born in 1949 who played running back and linebacker in the 1970s
Steve Conley (linebacker), American football player born in 1972 who played linebacker from 1996 to 2001
Steve Conley, comic book writer of Astounding Space Thrills